A petal is one member (or part) of the corolla of a flower.

Petal, Petals, or variants may also refer to:


Entertainment
 Petal (band), a rock band from Scranton, Pennsylvania
 Petals (TV series), 1989–1999 Australian children's TV series
 A Petal, a 1996 South Korean film

Other uses
 Petal, Mississippi, United States
 Petal Maps, an online map service based on data from OpenStreetMap
 Petal Search, a search engine, developed by Huawei
 Breast petal, a type of nipple shield
 In mathematics, portions of a topological space; see Rose (topology)

See also
 
 Pedal (disambiguation)
 Peddle, to sell something by going from place to place
 Peddle (surname)